"School of our Fathers" is the school song of Royal College Colombo. It is sung at the start of every school day except for Monday, when the National Anthem is sung, and on other important occasions. The words of the song were written by Major H. L. Reed, a principal of the school in the third term of 1927. The music was later revised by S. Schmid.

It was first performed on 13 July 1928, the same year Royal College Colombo won the Meaden Shield in the schools singing competition for the eighth year in succession. "School of our Fathers" was presented at the competition.

A Sinhala version of the college song was composed in 1968 on the request of the principal, W. A. Wickramasena and S. J. F. Dissanayake, who were masters of the school and had been part of the combination which composed the first song.

See also
 Royal College Colombo

References

External links
The College Song Royal College Colombo

Institutional songs
1927 songs
Royal College, Colombo